Miller Township is a township in Hand County, in the U.S. state of South Dakota.

History
Miller Township was named for Henry Miller, an early settler.

References

Townships in Hand County, South Dakota
Townships in South Dakota